This is a list of official departments, divisions, commissions, boards, programs, and agencies of the government of the U.S. state of Oregon, including regional commissions and boards to which it is officially a party.  Where a listing is that of a subdivision of another agency, the parent agency is indicated in parentheses.

A
Accountancy, Board of
Administrative Hearings, Office of (Oregon Employment Department)
Administrative Services, Department of
Agriculture, Department of
Air National Guard, Oregon (Oregon Military Department)
Appraiser Certification and Licensure Board
Architect Examiners, Board of
Archives Division (Oregon Secretary of State)
Arts Commission, Oregon (Oregon Economic and Community Development Department)
Asian Affairs, Commission on
Athletic Trainers, Board of
Audits Division (Oregon Secretary of State)
Aviation, Department of

B
Bar, Oregon State
Black Affairs, Commission on
Blind, Commission for the
Body Piercing Licensing Program
Brand Oregon
Building Codes Division (Department of Building Codes Standards)

C
Capitol Foundation, Oregon State
Capitol Planning Commission
Child Care Division (Oregon Employment Department)
Children, Adults and Families (Oregon Department of Human Services)
Children and Families, Oregon Commission on
Children's Trust Fund of Oregon
Chiropractic Examiners, Board of
Clinical Social Workers, Board of
Columbia River Gorge Commission
Community Colleges and Workforce Development, Department of
Construction Contractors Board
Consumer and Business Services, Department of
Corporations Division (Oregon Secretary of State)
Oregon Court of Appeals (Oregon Judicial Department)
Corrections, Department of
Cosmetology, Board of
Court Procedures, Council on
Counselors and Therapists, Oregon Board of Licensed Professional
Criminal Justice Commission, Oregon
Cultural Trust, Oregon

D
Dentistry, Oregon Board of
Denture Technology, Board of
Dietitians, Board of Examiners of Licensed
Disabilities Commission, Oregon
Dispute Resolution Commission
Driver and Motor Vehicles Services (Oregon Department of Transportation)

E
Economic and Community Development Department
Education, Department of (Oregon Superintendent of Public Instruction)
Elections Division (Secretary of State)
Electrologists, Permanent Color, Tattoo Artists, Board of
Emergency Board
Emergency Management Office (Oregon State Police)
Employment Department
Employment Relations Board
Energy, Department of
Engineering and Land Surveying, State Board of Examiners for
Environmental Health Registration Board
Environmental Quality, Department of
Ethics Commission

F
Film and Video Office, Oregon
Finance and Corporate Securities Division (Oregon Department of Consumer and Business Services)
Fire Marshal, Office of State (Oregon State Police)
Fish and Wildlife, Oregon Department of
Forest Resources Institute, Oregon
Forestry Department, State

G
Geologist Examiners, State Board of
Geology and Mineral Industries, Department of
Government Ethics Commission, Oregon (formerly: Government Standards and Practices Commission)
Governor, Office of the

H
Health Authority, Oregon
Health Licensing Office, Oregon
Health Services Division (Oregon Department of Human Services)
Hearing Aids, Advisory Council on
Hispanic Affairs, Commission on
Homeland Security, Office of
Housing and Community Services Department
Human Services, Department of

I
Oregon Insurance Division (Oregon Department of Consumer and Business Services)
Interoperability Executive Council, State
Invasive Species Council, Oregon
Investigators, Board of

J
Judicial Department
Judicial Fitness and Disability, Commission on
Justice, Oregon Department of (Oregon Attorney General)
Judicial Department, Oregon

L
Labor and Industries, Bureau of (See Oregon Commissioner of Labor and Industries)
Land Conservation and Development, Department of
Land Conservation and Development Commission (Oregon Department of Land Conservation and Development)
Land Use Board of Appeals 
Lands, Department of State
Landscape Architect Board, State
Landscape Contractors Board, State
Legislative Administration Committee
Legislative Assembly
Legislative Commission on Indian Services
Legislative Counsel Committee
Legislative Fiscal Office
Legislative Revenue Office
Lane County Local Government Boundary Commission
Library, Oregon State
Liquor Control Commission, Oregon
Long Term Care Ombudsman, Office of the
Lottery, Oregon State

M
Marine Board, Oregon State
Massage Therapists, Board of
Medical Board
Medical Examiner, State
Midwifery, Board Of Direct Entry
Medical Insurance Pool, Oregon (Oregon Department of Consumer and Business Services)
Military Department, Oregon
Minority, Women and Emerging Small Business Office (Oregon Department of Consumer and Business Services)
Mortuary and Cemetery Board, State
Motor Carrier Transportation Division (Oregon Department of Transportation)

N
National Guard, Oregon 
Naturopathic Examiners, Board of
Nursing, Oregon State Board of
Nursing Home Administrators, Board of Examiners of

O
Occupational Safety and Health Division (Oregon Department of Consumer and Business Services)
Occupational Therapy Licensing Board
Optometry, Oregon Board of

P
Pacific Northwest Electric Power and Conservation Planning Council
Pacific States Marine Fisheries Commission
Parks and Recreation Department, State
Patient Safety Commission
Parole and Post-Prison Supervision, State Board of
Performance Reporting Information System
Pharmacy, State Board of
Physical Therapist Licensing Board
Police, Department of State
Private Health Partnerships, Office of
Psychiatric Security Review Board
Psychologist Examiners, State Board of
Public Defense Services Commission
Public Employees Benefit Board
Public Employees Retirement System
Public Safety Standards and Training, Department of
Public Utility Commission

R
Racing Commission, Oregon
Radiologic Technology, Board of
Real Estate Agency
Resource and Technology Development Fund
Respiratory Therapist Licensing Board
Revenue, Department of

S
Salmon and Watersheds, Oregon Plan for
Secretary of State, Office of the
Senior Health Insurance Benefits Assistance
Seniors and People with Disabilities (Oregon Department of Human Services)
Speech-Language Pathology and Audiology, State Board of Examiners for
State Fair and Exposition Center, Oregon
Student Assistance Commission, Oregon
Supreme Court, Oregon (Oregon Judicial Department)

T
Tax Court, Oregon (Oregon Judicial Department)
Tax Practitioners, Board of
Tax Supervising and Conservation Commission
Teacher Standards and Practices Commission
Tourism Commission, Oregon
Transportation Commission, Oregon
Transportation, Department of
Travel Information Council
Treasury, State (Oregon State Treasurer)

U
Uniform State Laws, Commission on
University System, State

V
Veterans' Affairs, Department of
Veterinary Medical Examining Board, Oregon State

W
Water Resources Department
Watershed Enhancement Board, Oregon
Wine Board, Oregon
Women, Commission for
Workers Compensation Division, Oregon (Oregon Department of Consumer and Business Services)
Worksource Oregon

Y
Youth Authority, Oregon

See also
 Government of Oregon
 Oregon Progress Board
 Lists of Oregon-related topics

References

External links
 Oregon.gov

 
State agencies
Oregon